Ajamu Baly is a Sint Maarten politician currently serving as the second governor of Sint Maarten since 10 October 2022.

Early life and career
Ajamu Baly was born on St. Maarten, he attended Sister Borgia Elementary School in Philipsburg and subsequently the Milton Peters College. He later moved to the Netherlands to study law at the University of Amsterdam.

Baly returned to Sint Maarten after graduating with a law degree and started working at the Ministry of Justice and Security in the Judicial Affairs department. 

In February 2022, he was appointed as a Deputy Judge of Instruction at the Joint Court of Justice. He also currently serves on a number of boards and committees including the Supervisory Board of the Central Bank of Curaçao and Sint Maarten.

Governor of Sint Maarten
In October 2022, he was installed by the Council of Ministers of the Kingdom of the Netherlands as Governor of Sint Maarten, succeeding Eugene Holiday.

References

Living people
Governors of Sint Maarten
University of Amsterdam alumni
Year of birth missing (living people)